Andrew Keith may refer to:

 J. Andrew Keith (1958–1999), American author and games developer
 Andrew Keith, Lord Dingwall (died 1606), Scottish landowner, soldier, and diplomat
 Andrew Keith (courtier) (fl. 1613), Scottish courtier

See also

 Keith Andrews (disambiguation)
 
 Andrew (disambiguation)
 Keith (disambiguation)